is a women's football club playing in Japan's football league, Q League. Its hometown is the city of Kumamoto.

Squad

Current squad
As of 21 Feb. 2015 

 (c)

Results

Transition of team name
Kumamoto Ladies Akita : 1983 -1988
Akita FC Ladies : 1989 -1996
Mothers Kumamoto Rainbow Ladies : 1997
Renaissance Kumamoto FC : 1998 – 2010
Mashiki Renaissance Kumamoto FC : 2011 – 2016
Kumamoto Renaissance FC : 2017 – Present

References

External links
 Mashiki Renaissance Kumamoto F.C. official site
 Japanese Club Teams

Women's football clubs in Japan
Association football clubs established in 1991
1991 establishments in Japan
Sports teams in Kumamoto Prefecture